Three Plays for Puritans is a collection of plays by George Bernard Shaw published in 1901.

It consists of The Devil's Disciple (1897), Caesar and Cleopatra (1898) and Captain Brassbound's Conversion (1900), with a long preface by Shaw in three parts in which he expounds many of his thoughts on drama.

The title later appeared in a Penguin Classics edition.

1901 books
1900 plays
1901 plays
Plays by George Bernard Shaw
Books of plays